Mochi Magazine (also known as Mochi or Mochi Mag) is an online magazine that serves as a destination for Asian American women to share their stories, experiences, and passions. Mochi'''s mission is to amplify Asian voices and support the growth and inclusion of Asian American women.Mochi was founded by Maggie Hsu, Stephanie Wu, and Sandra Sohn in 2008. The magazine's conceived goal was to "provide a community for Asian American teenage girls to access sisterly advice and gain self-esteem", with articles written from a range of perspectives, including high school students, college women, young professionals, and other role models.
The magazine was originally intended to be a print publication, but transitioned online to appeal to a younger audience, overcome printing costs and reach a wider geographic range of readers. It is entirely run by an all-volunteer staff.

Current members of the executive board include Giannina Ong, Sarah Jinee Park, Melody Ip, and Adelina Sun.

 Features Mochi has served as a catalyst for conversation on the Asian American identity in the film, music, politics, fashion and everyday life. The first issue had actress Brenda Song as a cover girl, which was arranged through the founders' connection to the entertainment industry. Since then, Mochi has interviewed multiple prominent role models in the Asian American community, including YouTube beauty vlogger Michelle Phan, Yahoo! co-founder Jerry Yang, The Bling Ring actress Katie Chang, comedian Margaret Cho, professional golfer Michelle Wie, Bay Area politician Evan Low, Big Hero 6 actor Daniel Henney, Mandopop singer Wang Leehom, and K-pop group f(x)'s Amber Liu, among others.

In 2010, Mochi released the first and only comprehensive college guide for Asian American teens. A year later, Mochi compiled a list of twenty-five influential Asian American youth in an article called "The Ultimate 25 under 25", published in the Spring 2011 issue. Although entertainment and beauty articles have attracted the majority of site hits, Mochi has also published a diverse collection of articles pertaining to health, mental well-being, relationships, food, travel and culture.

Over the years, Mochi writers have addressed hard-hitting issues in the Asian American community, such as the Asian American body image, the model minority myth, the "bamboo ceiling", and stigma surrounding LGBT identity and interracial dating. Since 2011, Mochi has published a series of articles on safe sex and protection against STDs. With the rise of the digital age, there has been an increasing focus on articles guiding young women interested in pursuing technology careers.

 Events and Partnerships 
 Live Networking 
In October 2011, Mochi hosted its first live networking event called "Faces of Mochi" in New York's Folli Follie store, celebrating the launch of its Fall 2011 issue, thus gathering young Asian Americans all across the country for a night full of fashion and fun. In September 2012, Mochi hosted its first open model call at the Work Gallery in Ann Arbor, Michigan. In the following years, Mochi continued to hold special events, including wine socials, shopping experiences at BaubleBar (March 2013) and Club Clio (May 2015), chocolate tastings with ROYCE' Chocolate (June 2013) and movies screenings (November 2013).

 Panels and Workshops Mochi has a growing presence at journalism workshops and Asian American community events. Executive board members and staff members have presented at the Midwest Asian American Students Union (MAASU), the East Coast Asian American Student Union (ECAASU), and the Intercollegiate Taiwanese American Students Association (ITASA). In November 2013, co-founder Maggie Hsu visited several East Coast collegiate organizations including the Chinese Students' Association, Sangam and Taiwanese Society at UPenn and Kappa Phi Lambda sorority at University of Connecticut.

 Collaborations Mochi has partnered with various Asian American interest groups such as the Banyan Tree Project, Audrey, NYU-based Asian American publication Generasian, Kollaboration, ITASA, Harvard University's Identities Fashion Show, Amp Music Festival, Lunar New Year Festival by Xi'an Famous Foods, and others, through co-hosted events and sponsored posts.

 Recognition Mochi earned recognition as an up-and-coming business venture at the Harvard Asian American Alumni Summit in 2010, reaching the semi-finalist stage of the Elevate Pitch Competition. Semi-finalists were chosen by a panel of judges "based on the creativity, integrity and originality of their ideas, as well as worthiness of funding."

"Diagnosing the Asian American Eating Disorder," an article written for the Winter 2010 issue, was later republished in the 2012 edition of Eating Disorders (Opposing Viewpoints), a Cengage textbook. Other articles by Mochi have been cited by major media outlets in the past, including New York Magazine, Complex, XoJane,and VICE. Past issues Mochi'' released 33 issues since 2008.

References

External links

Online magazines published in the United States
Quarterly magazines published in the United States
Women's magazines published in the United States
Asian-American magazines
Entertainment magazines published in the United States
English-language magazines
Literature by Asian-American women
Magazines established in 2008
Magazines published in New York City
Women's fashion magazines